The Lune Aqueduct is a navigable aqueduct that carries the Lancaster Canal over the River Lune, on the east side of the city of Lancaster in Lancashire, England. It was completed in 1797 at a total cost of £48,320 18s 10d.
It is a Grade I listed building.

Construction
The aqueduct was designed by civil engineer John Rennie and constructed by architect Alexander Stevens (died 1796, aged 66). The cost of the construction was close to £50,000.

The aqueduct is a traditional structure of that time, consisting of five stone arches supporting the stone trough. Within the piers, special volcanic pozzolana powder was imported to be mixed with cement, which allowed the concrete to set under water.
Because of the rush to finish the initial stages, before the winter floods, the construction was carried out around the clock and the final bill for the project was over £30,000 over budget (2.6 times the original estimate).  This vast overspend was the reason that the Lancaster canal was never joined to the main canal network – there wasn't enough money for the planned aqueduct over the River Ribble at the southern end of the canal.

Recent restoration
Work began to restore the aqueduct in January 2011, and was completed in March 2012. The work involved restoring the canal channel, masonry repairs, removing graffiti, and improving public access. The project cost £2.4m, and was funded by British Waterways, Lancaster Canal Trust, English Heritage and the Heritage Lottery Fund.

Inscriptions
The structure bears two inscriptions:

North side: "To Public Prosperity"
South side: "QUAE DEERANT ADEUNT: SOCIANTUR DISSITA: MERCES FLUMINA CONVENIUNT ARTE DATURA NOVAS. A.D. MDCCXCVII. ING. I. RENNIE EXTRUX. A. STEVENS. P. ET F." which can be translated as: "Things that are wanting are brought together / Things remote are connected / Rivers themselves meet by the assistance of art / To afford new objects of commerce.  AD 1797. Engineer J Rennie. Built A Stevens father and son" (translated from the Latin)

Gallery

See also

Grade I listed buildings in Lancashire
Listed buildings in Halton-with-Aughton
Listed buildings in Quernmore
Canals of the United Kingdom
List of canal aqueducts in the United Kingdom

Notes

References

Lancaster Canal
Bridges across the River Lune
Canals in Lancashire
Grade I listed bridges
Grade I listed buildings in Lancashire
Tourist attractions in Lancaster, Lancashire
Navigable aqueducts in England
Bridges in Lancaster, Lancashire
Grade I listed canals
Transport in the City of Lancaster